Thomas Dornbrook (born December 1, 1956 in Berea, Ohio) is a former professional American football player who played Center and Guard for two seasons for the Pittsburgh Steelers. In 1979, Dornbrook earned a ring in Super Bowl XIV over the Los Angeles Rams. He played for the Miami Dolphins in 1980. He later played in the USFL and won the 1983 USFL Championship as the starting center for the Michigan Panthers.  He played for Michigan in 1983 and 1984 and in 1985 for the Orlando Renegades.

References

1956 births
Living people
American football offensive guards
Kentucky Wildcats football players
Pittsburgh Steelers players
Miami Dolphins players
Michigan Panthers players
Washington Federals/Orlando Renegades players
Players of American football from Ohio